is a professional Go player.

Biography
Nakamura became a professional in 1991. He reached 8 dan, in 2001 and is currently 9 dan. Nakamura was taught by Yorimoto Yamashita. In 1996, Nakamura lost in the Shinjin-O final to future Honinbō Shinji Takao. Two years later, in 1998, he won his first and only title, the 13th NEC Shun-Ei.

His daughter Sumire Nakamura is also a professional Go player.

Titles & runners-up

External links
GoBase Profile
Nihon Ki-in Profile (Japanese)

1973 births
Japanese Go players
Living people